Snake River Falls is  located west of Arapahoe Basin on the North Fork Snake River.

References

Waterfalls of Colorado
Landforms of Summit County, Colorado
Tourist attractions in Summit County, Colorado